is a syllable in the Javanese script that represent the sound /d̪ɔ/, /d̪a/. It is transliterated to Latin as "da", and sometimes in Indonesian orthography as "do".

Pasangan 
Its pasangan form , is located on the bottom side of the previous syllable. For example,  - anduk (towel).

Extended form 
The letter ꦢ doesn't have a murda form.

Using cecak telu, the syllable represents /dz/.

Glyphs

Unicode block 

Javanese script was added to the Unicode Standard in October, 2009 with the release of version 5.2.

References 

Javanese script